The 'Muthuvans' or 'Mudugars' are tribe of cultivators in hills of Coimbatore and Madurai. They are also found in Adimali and Devikulam forest regions of Idukki district, Kerala. The 'Muthuvan’ people were loyal subjects of the dynasty of Madurai, according to tribal legend. When the dynasty was deposed, the surviving royal members migrated to Travancore, central Kerala. On their way to Kerala, the Muthuvas carried the idols of Madurai Meenakshi, the deity of the royal family, on their backs. The word Muthuvar in Tamil is used to denote the same community in Tamil Nadu. The word "Muthu" means elder and literal meaning of "Muthuvar" is elders. Muthuvan are the ancient tribes of this land.

The Muthuvans are very independent and reluctant to interact with the outside world. The Muthuva tribe grows ragi, cardamom and lemon grass. Now they are also cultivating banana and tapioca for their daily usage. Most of their women are illiterate and strongly bonded with their customs.

See also
 Edamalakkudy
 Muthuvan language

References 

Social groups of India
Ethnic groups in India
Social groups of Kerala